The Hidden is More Immense (Arabic: ما خفي أعظم, Ma khafia A'etham) or The Tip of the Iceberg
is an Arabic political investigative journalism TV series focusing mainly on the current events in the Middle East, and the Muslim world. The program is produced and aired by Al Jazeera and is presented by Tamer Al Misshal. Some of the episodes have been localised to English and broadcast on the Al Jazeera English channel as part of networkwide documentary strand Al Jazeera World.

Title translation 
The name of the TV show in Arabic is (ما خفي أعظم, Ma khafia A'etham), which is an expression that could be translated into English as The Hidden is More Immense, Still Waters Run Deep, or The Tip of the Iceberg.

Episodes

2016

2017

2018

2019

2020

Popularity 
The episodes are posted on Al Jazeera's website, YouTube page, and on social media such as Facebook. The YouTube videos have had millions of views.

See also
 Bela Hodod
 The Opposite Direction

External links
 Official Website 
 Al Jazeera World - Official page

References 

Al Jazeera
Al Jazeera shows
Arabic-language television shows
Investigative journalism
2016 in Qatari television
2010s Qatari television series debuts
2017 in Qatari television
2018 in Qatari television
2019 in Qatari television
2020 in Qatari television